Wulan is a county in Qinghai, China.

Wulan may also refer to:

Wulan (TV series), a 2006–2007 Indonesian soap opera television series
Wulan (Javanese calendar), month in Javanese calendar
Ulan (politician) or Wulan, Chinese politician

See also
 Ulan (disambiguation)
 Ulaan (disambiguation), Mongolian word for red